Jordan Redman is an American politician serving as a member of the Idaho House of Representatives for the 3B district. He assumed office on December 1, 2022.

Early life and education 
Redman was born in Coeur d'Alene, Idaho, and graduated from Timberlake High School. He attended North Idaho College, Whitworth University, and the University of Idaho, but did not earn a degree.

Career 
Outside of politics, Redman works in the insurance, financial services, and real estate industries. He was elected to the Idaho House of Representatives in November 2022.

References 

Living people
People from Coeur d'Alene, Idaho
People from Kootenai County, Idaho
Idaho Republicans
Members of the Idaho House of Representatives
Year of birth missing (living people)